Soorat Aur Seerat is a 1962 Hindi film directed by Rajnish Behl. The film stars Dharmendra, Nutan, K. N. Singh, Iftekar and Asit Sen.
The film's music is by Roshan.

Soundtrack 
"Jaise Court Me Hakim Ki Chale Re" – Asha Bhonsle
"Garaj Ho To Nakhare Dikhati Hai Biwi" – Mohammad Rafi
"Bahut diya dene wale ne tujhko" – Mukesh

The opening tune of the song "Bahut diya dene wale ne tujhko" is extremely similar to the song "Yeh Bandhan Toh" from the Hindi film "Karan Arjun" (1995).

External links 
 

1962 films
1960s Hindi-language films
Films scored by Roshan